The 2012–13 Minnesota Timberwolves season was the 24th season for the franchise in the National Basketball Association (NBA). The team missed the playoffs for the 9th straight season, but won at least 30 games for the first time since Kevin Garnett was traded.

Key dates
 June 28, 2012: The 2012 NBA draft took place at the Prudential Center in Newark, New Jersey.

Draft

Roster

Pre-season

|- style="background:#cfc;"
| 1
| October 10
| Indiana
| 
| Budinger & Peković (14)
| Kevin Love (8)
| Barea & Shved (4)
| Fargodome9,163
| 1–0
|- style="background:#fcc;"
| 2
| October 12
| @ Indiana
| 
| Derrick Williams (25)
| Kevin Love (9)
| Will Conroy (6)
| Bankers Life Fieldhouse10,794
| 1–1
|- style="background:#cfc;"
| 3
| October 13
| Chicago
| 
| Nikola Peković (16)
| Nikola Peković (17)
| Brandon Roy (4)
| Target Center12,251
| 2–1
|- style="background:#cfc;"
| 4
| October 16
| Maccabi Haifa
| 
| Kevin Love (24)
| Nikola Peković (9)
| José Juan Barea (7)
| Target Center11,192
| 3–1
|- style="background:#fcc;"
| 5
| October 19
| @ Chicago
| 
| Cunningham, Kirilenko (12)
| Greg Stiemsma (7)
| Roy, Amundson & Conroy (3)
| United Center21,418
| 3–2
|- style="background:#cfc;"
| 6
| October 24
| Detroit
| 
| Chase Budinger (21)
| Dante Cunningham (14)
| José Juan Barea (7)
| MTS Centre12,163
| 4–2
|- style="background:#cfc;"
| 7
| October 26
| @ Milwaukee
| 
| Chase Budinger (20)
| Andrei Kirilenko (10)
| Alexey Shved (8)
| Resch Center4,165
| 5–2

Regular season

Game log

|- style="background:#cfc;"
| 1 || November 2 || Sacramento
| 
| José Juan Barea (21)
| Dante Cunningham (9)
| Brandon Roy (6)
| Target Center19,356
| 1–0
|- style="background:#fcc;"
| 2 || November 4 || @ Toronto
| 
| Andrei Kirilenko (17)
| Derrick Williams (8)
| Luke Ridnour (5)
| Air Canada Centre16,754
| 1-1
|- style="background:#cfc;"
| 3 || November 5 || @ Brooklyn
| 
| Nikola Peković (21)
| Dante Cunningham (11)
| Brandon Roy (7)
| Barclays Center14,017
| 2-1
|- style="background:#cfc;"
| 4 || November 7 || Orlando
| 
| Luke Ridnour (19)
| Derrick Williams (6)
| Brandon Roy (9)
| Target Center17,121
| 3-1
|- style="background:#cfc;"
| 5 || November 9 || Indiana
| 
| Chase Budinger (18)
| Nikola Peković (8)
| Alexey Shved (7)
| Target Center18,222
| 4-1
|- style="background:#fcc;"
| 6 || November 10 || @ Chicago
| 
| Nikola Peković (18)
| Andrei Kirilenko (12)
| Andrei Kirilenko (7)
| United Center21,974
| 4-2
|- style="background:#cfc;"
| 7 || November 12 || @ Dallas
| 
| Nikola Peković (20)
| Andrei Kirilenko (11)
| Luke Ridnour (7)
| American Airlines Center19,322
| 5-2
|- style="background:#fcc;"
| 8 || November 14 || Charlotte
| 
| Andrei Kirilenko (26)
| Andrei Kirilenko (12)
| Luke Ridnour (10)
| Target Center13,272
| 5-3
|- style="background:#fcc;"
| 9 || November 16 || Golden State
| 
| Derrick Williams (23)
| Derrick Williams (7)
| Alexey Shved (7)
| Target Center16,013
| 5-4
|- style="background:#fcc;"
| 10 || November 21 || Denver
| 
| Kevin Love (34)
| Kevin Love (14)
| Luke Ridnour (6)
| Target Center16,879
| 5-5
|- style="background:#fcc;"
| 11 || November 23 || @ Portland
| 
| Kevin Love (24)
| Kevin Love (13)
| Andrei Kirilenko (5)
| Rose Garden20,555
| 5-6
|- style="background:#fcc;"
| 12 || November 24 || @ Golden State
| 
| Nikola Peković (17)
| Kevin Love (15)
| José Juan Barea (10)
| Oracle Arena19,084
| 5-7
|- style="background:#cfc;"
| 13 || November 27 || @ Sacramento
| 
| Kevin Love (23)
| Kevin Love (24)
| José Juan Barea (6)
| Power Balance Pavilion10,741
| 6-7
|- style="background:#fcc;"
| 14 || November 28 || @ L. A. Clippers
| 
| Kevin Love (19)
| Kevin Love (12)
| Luke Ridnour (7)
| Staples Center19,060
| 6-8
|- style="background:#cfc;"
| 15 || November 30 || Milwaukee
| 
| Ridnour & Shved (16)
| Nikola Peković (16)
| Barea & Shved (5)
| Target Center16,418
| 7-8

|- style="background:#cfc;"
| 16 || December 4 || @ Philadelphia
| 
| Alexey Shved (17)
| Howard & Love (10)
| José Juan Barea (10)
| Wells Fargo Center13,986
| 8-8
|- style="background:#fcc;"
| 17 || December 5 || @ Boston
| 
| Kevin Love (19)
| Kevin Love (13)
| Luke Ridnour (5)
| TD Garden18,624
| 8-9
|- style="background:#cfc;"
| 18 || December 7 || Cleveland
| 
| Kevin Love (36)
| Kevin Love (13)
| Luke Ridnour (7)
| Target Center16,623
| 9-9
|- style="background:#cfc;"
| 19 || December 12 || Denver
| 
| Nikola Peković (22)
| Kevin Love (14)
| José Juan Barea (8)
| Target Center16,444
| 10-9
|- style="background:#cfc;"
| 20 || December 14 || @ New Orleans
| 
| Nikola Peković (31)
| Andrei Kirilenko (11)
| Luke Ridnour (10)
| New Orleans Arena14,671
| 11-9
|- style="background:#cfc;"
| 21 || December 15 || Dallas
| 
| Nikola Peković (21)
| Andrei Kirilenko (10)
| Ricky Rubio (9)
| Target Center18,173
| 12-9
|- style="background:#fcc;"
| 22 || December 17 || @ Orlando
| 
| Kevin Love (23)
| Kevin Love (15)
| Barea & Kirilenko (6)
| Amway Center16,992
| 12-10
|- style="background:#fcc;"
| 23 || December 18 || @ Miami
| 
| Andrei Kirilenko (22)
| Kevin Love (18)
| Alexey Shved (8)
| American Airlines Arena19,862
| 12-11
|- style="background:#cfc;"
| 24 || December 20 || Oklahoma City
| 
| Kevin Love (28)
| Kevin Love (11)
| Alexey Shved (12)
| Target Center17,114
| 13-11
|- style="background:#fcc;"
| 25 || December 23 || @ New York
| 
| Nikola Peković (21)
| Nikola Peković (17)
| Luke Ridnour (5)
| Madison Square Garden19,033
| 13-12
|- style="background:#fcc;"
| 26 || December 26 || Houston
| 
| José Juan Barea (18)
| Kevin Love (12)
| Luke Ridnour (4)
| Target Center20,340
| 13-13
|- style="background:#cfc;"
| 27 || December 29 || Phoenix
| 
| Nikola Peković (28)
| Kevin Love (18)
| Alexey Shved (10)
| Target Center19,356
| 14-13

|- style="background:#fcc;"
| 28 || January 2 || @ Utah
| 
| Love & Shved (13)
| Kevin Love (10)
| José Juan Barea (4)
| EnergySolutions Arena19,120
| 14-14
|- style="background:#cfc;"
| 29 || January 3 || @ Denver
| 
| Barea & Shved (17)
| Kevin Love (17)
| Barea & Shved (5)
| Pepsi Center16,921
| 15-14
|- style="background:#fcc;"
| 30 || January 5 || Portland
| 
| Nikola Peković (21)
| Nikola Peković (15)
| Barea & Shved (7)
| Target Center16,220
| 15-15
|- style="background:#cfc;"
| 31 || January 8 || Atlanta
| 
| Nikola Peković (25)
| Nikola Peković (18)
| Ricky Rubio (8)
| Target Center15,988
| 16-15
|- style="background:#fcc;"
| 32 || January 9 || @ Oklahoma City
| 
| Alexey Shved (18)
| Derrick Williams (11)
| Ricky Rubio (7)
| Chesapeake Energy Arena18,203
| 16-16
|- style="background:#fcc;"
| 33 || January 11 || @ New Orleans
| 
| Luke Ridnour (20)
| Dante Cunningham (9)
| Alexey Shved (7)
| New Orleans Arena 13,538
| 16-17
|- style="background:#fcc;"
| 34 || January 13 || @ San Antonio
| 
| José Juan Barea (4)
| Andrei Kirilenko (22)
| Barea & Ridnour (6)
| AT&T Center18,144
| 16-18
|- style="background:#fcc;"
| 35 || January 14 || @ Dallas
| 
| José Juan Barea (21)
| Nikola Peković (12)
| Ricky Rubio (6)
| American Airlines Center19,486
| 16-19
|- style="background:#fcc;"
| 36 || January 17 || L. A. Clippers
| 
| Luke Ridnour (21)
| Nikola Peković (9)
| Ricky Rubio (6)
| Target Center16,198
| 16-20
|- style="background:#cfc;"
| 37 || January 19 || Houston
| 
| Andrei Kirilenko (21)
| Andrei Kirilenko (11)
| Ricky Rubio (6)
| Target Center16,799
| 17-20
|- style="background:#fcc;"
| 38 || January 21 || @ Atlanta
| 
| Derrick Williams (17)
| Andrei Kirilenko (6)
| José Juan Barea (7)
| Philips Arena13,808
| 17-21
|- style="background:#fcc;"
| 39 || January 23 || Brooklyn
| 
| Andrei Kirilenko (15)
| Johnson, Kirilenko& Williams (6)
| José Juan Barea (8)
| Target Center15,785
| 17-22
|- style="background:#fcc;"
| 40 || January 25 || @ Washington
| 
| Derrick Williams (18)
| Derrick Williams (11)
| Rubio & Stiemsma (6)
| Verizon Center14,095
| 17-23
|- style="background:#fcc;"
| 41 || January 26 || @ Charlotte
| 
| Luke Ridnour (22)
| Ridnour & Stiemsma (7)
| Ricky Rubio (8)
| Time Warner Cable Arena15,397
| 17-24
|- style="background:#fcc;"
| 42 || January 30 || L. A. Clippers
| 
| Nikola Peković (17)
| Nikola Peković (12)
| Barea, Kirilenko,& Rubio (4)
| Target Center15,312
| 17-25

|- style="background:#fcc;"
| 43 || February 1 || L. A. Lakers
| 
| Alexey Shved (18)
| Pekovic & Williams (9)
| Ricky Rubio (7)
| Target Center18,547
| 17-26
|- style="background:#cfc;"
| 44 || February 2 || New Orleans
| 
| Dante Cunningham (18)
| Nikola Peković (7)
| Alexey Shved (8)
| Target Center16,289
| 18-26
|- style="background:#fcc;"
| 45 || February 4 || Portland
| 
| Dante Cunningham (23)
| Nikola Peković (11)
| Ricky Rubio (14)
| Target Center13,446
| 18-27
|- style="background:#fcc;"
| 46 || February 6 || San Antonio
| 
| Nikola Peković (21)
| Derrick Williams (12)
| Ricky Rubio (11)
| Target Center15,224
| 18-28
|- style="background:#fcc;"
| 47 || February 8 || New York
| 
| Luke Ridnour (20)
| Nikola Peković (11)
| Ricky Rubio (11)
| Target Center16,502
| 18-29
|- style="background:#fcc;"
| 48 || February 10 || @ Memphis
| 
| Ridnour & Rubio (17)
| Pekovic & Williams (6)
| Alexey Shved (9)
| FedExForum16,023
| 18-30
|- style="background:#cfc;"
| 49 || February 11 || @ Cleveland
| 
| Luke Ridnour (21)
| Nikola Peković (10)
| Ricky Rubio (10)
| Quicken Loans Arena11,556
| 19-30
|- style="background:#fcc;"      
| 50 || February 13 || Utah
| 
| Derrick Williams (24)
| Derrick Williams (16)
| Ricky Rubio (10)
| Target Center13,117
| 19-31
|- align="center"
|colspan="9" bgcolor="#bbcaff"|All-Star Break
|- style="background:#cfc;"       
| 51 || February 20 || Philadelphia
| 
| Nikola Peković (27)
| Nikola Peković (18)
| Ricky Rubio (6)
| Target Center14,439
| 20-31
|- style="background:#fcc;"      
| 52 || February 22 || @ Oklahoma City
| 
| Alexey Shved (17)
| Greg Stiemsma (6)
| Ricky Rubio (9)
| Chesapeake Energy Arena18,203
| 20-32
|- style="background:#fcc;"       
| 53 || February 24 || Golden State
| 
| Derrick Williams (23)
| Derrick Williams (12)
| Ricky Rubio (11)
| Target Center18,033
| 20-33
|- style="background:#fcc;"     
| 54 || February 26 || @ Phoenix
| 
| Derrick Williams (21)
| Derrick Williams (11)
| Ricky Rubio (10)
| US Airways Center14,973
| 20-34
|- style="background:#fcc;"      
| 55 || February 28 || @ L. A. Lakers
| 
| José Juan Barea (23)
| Derrick Williams (8)
| Ricky Rubio (13)
| Staples Center18,997
| 20-35

|- style="background:#fcc;"      
| 56 || March 2 || @ Portland
| 
| Derrick Williams (23)
| Ricky Rubio (9)
| Ricky Rubio (9)
| Rose Garden20,390
| 20-36
|- style="background:#fcc;"       
| 57 || March 4 || Miami
| 
| Derrick Williams (25)
| Dante Cunningham (11)
| Ricky Rubio (8)
| Target Center18,391
| 20-37
|- style="background:#cfc;"       
| 58 || March 6 || Washington
| 
| Derrick Williams (16)
| Derrick Williams (8)
| Ricky Rubio (11)
| Target Center13,233
| 21-37
|- style="background:#fcc;"      
| 59 || March 9 || @ Denver
| 
| Mickaël Gelabale (19)
| Chris Johnson (8)
| Ricky Rubio (6)
| Pepsi Center18,823
| 21-38
|- style="background:#fcc;"        
| 60 || March 10 || Dallas
| 
| Derrick Williams (18)
| Derrick Williams (9)
| Luke Ridnour (5)
| Target Center15,209
| 21-39
|- style="background:#cfc;"       
| 61 || March 12 || San Antonio
| 
| Ricky Rubio (21)
| Ricky Rubio (13)
| Ricky Rubio (12)
| Target Center14,219
| 22-39
|- style="background:#fcc;"        
| 62 || March 13 || @ Indiana
| 
| Ricky Rubio (21)
| Greg Stiemsma (9)
| Ricky Rubio (10)
| Bankers Life Fieldhouse14,187
| 22-40
|- style="background:#fcc;"       
| 63 || March 15 || @ Houston
| 
| Derrick Williams (19)
| Mickaël Gelabale (7)
| Ricky Rubio (7)
| Toyota Center18,046
| 22-41
|- style="background:#cfc;"        
| 64 || March 17 || New Orleans
| 
| Derrick Williams (28)
| Derrick Williams (7)
| Luke Ridnour (6)
| Target Center14,246
| 23-41
|- style="background:#fcc;"        
| 65 || March 18 || @ Memphis
| 
| Alexey Shved (12)
| Mickaël Gelabale (7)
| Luke Ridnour (3)
| FedExForum16,378
| 23-42
|- style="background:#fcc;"        
| 66 || March 21 || @ Sacramento
| 
| Nikola Peković (18)
| Nikola Peković (12)
| Ricky Rubio (9)
| Power Balance Pavilion12,176
| 23-43
|- style="background:#cfc;"       
| 67 || March 22 || @ Phoenix
| 
| Andrei Kirilenko (20)
| Greg Stiemsma (10)
| Ricky Rubio (8)
| US Airways Center16,155
| 24-43
|- style="background:#fcc;"       
| 68 || March 24 || Chicago
| 
| Derrick Williams (28)
| Nikola Peković (8)
| Ricky Rubio (8)
| Target Center17,330
| 24-44
|- style="background:#cfc;"      
| 69 || March 26 || @ Detroit
| 
| José Juan Barea (21)
| Nikola Peković (11)
| Ricky Rubio (9)
| The Palace of Auburn Hills16,877
| 25-44
|- style="background:#fcc;"        
| 70 || March 27 || L. A. Lakers
| 
| Nikola Peković (19)
| Nikola Peković (16)
| Ricky Rubio (7)
| Target Center18,029
| 25-45
|- style="background:#cfc;"       
| 71 || March 29 || Oklahoma City
| 
| Nikola Peković (22)
| Nikola Peković (15)
| Ricky Rubio (7)
| Target Center18,121
| 26-45
|- style="background:#fcc;"        
| 72 || March 30 || Memphis
| 
| Ricky Rubio (23)
| Ricky Rubio (10)
| Ricky Rubio (9)
| Target Center13,680
| 26-46

|- style="background:#cfc;"       
| 73 || April 1 || Boston
| 
| Nikola Peković (29)
| Andrei Kirilenko (9)
| Ricky Rubio (10)
| Target Center14,546
| 27-46
|- style="background:#cfc;"       
| 74 || April 3 || @ Milwaukee
| 
| Nikola Peković (27)
| Nikola Peković (8)
| Ricky Rubio (12)
| BMO Harris Bradley Center15,386
| 28-46
|- style="background:#fcc;"       
| 75 || April 5 || Toronto
| 
| Nikola Peković (24)
| Nikola Peković (8)
| Ricky Rubio (12)
| Target Center16,661
| 28-47
|- style="background:#cfc;"        
| 76 || April 6 || Detroit
| 
| Nikola Peković (20)
| Nikola Peković (13)
| Ricky Rubio (6)
| Target Center15,311
| 29-47
|- style="background:#fcc;"        
| 77 || April 9 || @ Golden State
| 
| Chase Budinger (17)
| Greg Stiemsma (9)
| Alexey Shved (9)
| Oracle Arena19,596
| 29-48
|- style="background:#fcc;"       
| 78 || April 10 || @ L. A. Clippers
|  
| Nikola Peković (20)
| Derrick Williams (10)
| Ricky Rubio (7)
| Staples Center19,060
| 29-49
|- style="background:#fcc;"        
| 79 || April 12 || @ Utah
| 
| José Juan Barea (23)
| Greg Stiemsma (7)
| Alexey Shved (5)
| EnergySolutions Arena19,609
| 29-50
|- style="background:#cfc;"        
| 80 || April 13 || Phoenix
| 
| Ricky Rubio (24)
| Dante Cunningham (8)
| Ricky Rubio (10)
| Target Center16,701
| 30-50
|- style="background:#fcc;"       
| 81 || April 15 || Utah
| 
| Derrick Williams (18)
| Greg Stiemsma (8)
| José Juan Barea (5)
| Target Center17,009
| 30-51
|- style="background:#cfc;"       
| 82 || April 17 || @ San Antonio
| 
| Derrick Williams (21)
| Greg Stiemsma (9)
| Luke Ridnour (6)
| AT&T Center18,581
| 31-51

Standings

Injuries
Kevin Love suffered a fracture in his right hand during a team workout midway through the pre-season. He is expected to be sidelined between six and eight weeks.

Transactions

Overview

Trades

Free agents

References

Minnesota Timberwolves seasons
Minnesot Timberwolves
2012 in sports in Minnesota
2013 in sports in Minnesota